Apostol Tnokovski is a Macedonian product designer. His product design concepts are very inventive and unique. He often uses organic forms and the main inspiration for his work comes from the sea world. In 2010 he became widely known with his Hydra piano concept, inspired by Lady Gaga.

 
His wide range of work includes furniture design, shoes, concept cars, consumer products, watches and pianos.

References

External links
Apostol Tnokovski Portfolio

Macedonian designers
Product designers
Living people
1982 births
Businesspeople from Skopje